Crimson Sabre is a Hong Kong television series adapted from Louis Cha's novel Sword Stained with Royal Blood. The series was first broadcast on TVB in Hong Kong in 2000.

Cast
 Note: Some of the characters' names are in Cantonese romanisation.

 Gordon Lam as Yun Sing-chi
 Lee Chun-leung as Yun Sing-chi (young)
 Charmaine Sheh as Ah-kau / Princess Cheung-ping
 Kwong Wa as Ha Suet-yee
 Melissa Ng as Wan Yee / Wan Sin
 Sarah Au as Wan Ching-ching / Ha Ching-ching
 Fung Ho-see as Wan Sin (young)
 Fiona Yuen as Ho Tit-sau
 Emily Kwan as Ho Hong-yeuk
 Yeung Man-na as On Siu-wai
 Wong Mei-kei as On Siu-wai (young)
 Lo Hing-fai as To-yee-kwan
 Ku Feng as Muk Yan-ching
 Felix Lok as Lei Tsi-sing
 Chun Wong as Wong Tsan
 Henry Lee as Lei Ngam
 Lau Dan as Wong-toi-kik
 Wong Wai as Sung-tsing Emperor
 Wong Chi-wah as Yun Sung-wan
 Lily Liu as Yun Sung-wan's wife
 Lee Hoi-sang as Chief Chu
 Yu Tsi-ming as Taoist Muk-song
 Wong Tin-chak as Ngau Kam-sing
 Tony Kwong as Kwai Sun-shu
 Ricky Wong as Wan Fong-tat
 Lau Kwai-fong as Wan Fong-tat's wife
 Kiu Hung as Wan Fong-yee
 Tsang Wai-wan as Wan Fong-yee's wife
 Lily Li as Aunt Hang
 Lau Kong as Wan Fong-san
 Law Lan as Wan Fong-san's wife
 Lee Hung-kit as Wan Fong-see
 Wong Fung-leung as Wan Fong-see's wife
 Kwan Ching as Wan Fong-ng
 Wong Sun-wai as Wan Fong-ng's wife
 Chan Wing-chun as Sa Tin-kwong
 Jerry Ku as Fu Tau-tor
 Henry Lo as Sing Ching-chuk
 Yu San-kwong as Cho Wah-shun
 Cheung Hon-ban as Kiu Kung-lai
 June Chan as Suen Chung-kwan
 Yau Biu as Mui Kim-wo
 Mak Ka-lun as See Bing-man
 Wong Man-piu as See Bing-lit
 Lee Kwok-lun as Yuk-tsan-chi
 Joe Ma as Lung Tin
 Mak Cheung-ching as Iron Arhat
 Lam King-kong as Wu Kwai-nam
 Tang Tse-yiu as See Bing-kwong
 Chan Tik-hak as Chu Hong-lau
 Raymond Lam as intruder (cameo)

External links
 Crimson Sabre page on TVB website

2000 Hong Kong television series debuts
2000 Hong Kong television series endings
TVB dramas
Works based on Sword Stained with Royal Blood
Hong Kong wuxia television series
Television series set in the Ming dynasty
Television shows based on works by Jin Yong
Television series set in the 17th century